Chronicles of the Clans of Wei (魏氏春秋) is a Chinese history book of Cao Wei. 
It was written by Sun Sheng (孫盛) in the 4th century. 

Now its contents survive only in annotations in other books. For example, the Chronicles of the Clans of Wei was used by Pei Songzhi
in his annotation of Records of the Three Kingdoms.

Lost books
4th-century books
History books about the Three Kingdoms